The de Warenne family were a noble family in England that included the first Earls of Surrey, created by William the Conqueror in 1088 for William de Warenne, 1st Earl of Surrey, who was among his companions at the Battle of Hastings. The family originated in Normandy and as Earls, held land there and throughout England.  When the senior male-line ended in the mid-12th century, the descendants of their heiress adopted the Warenne surname and continue as Earls of Surrey for another two centuries.  Several junior lines also held land or prominent offices in England and Normandy.

Etymology
The Warenne family derived their toponymic surname from the village of Varenne, river Varenne, near Arques-la-Bataille, Duchy of Normandy, now in the canton of Bellencombre, Seine Maritime.

Origin
William de Warenne, 1st Earl of Surrey is accepted as having been son of a Norman named Ranulf de Warenne, but the early Anglo-Norman chroniclers gave confusing and contradictory accounts of the origins and relatives of this family.  In his additions to the Gesta Normannorum Ducum of William of Jumièges, chronicler Robert of Torigny reported that William de Warenne, 1st Earl of Surrey, and Anglo-Norman baron Roger of Mortemer were brothers, both sons of an unnamed niece of Gunnor, Duchess of Normandy, making the family akin to her great-grandson, William the Conqueror.  Unfortunately, Robert's genealogies are somewhat confused, and he elsewhere makes Roger a son of William de Warenne, and yet again makes both the sons of Walter de Saint Martin.  Likewise, several of the descents Robert gives for Gunnor's family appear to contain too few generations. Orderic Vitalis describes William as Roger's consanguineus, literally "cousin" but more generically a term of close kinship that is not typically used to describe brothers, and Roger de Mortemer appears to have been a generation older than William de Warenne.

Charters report several earlier men associated with Warenne. A Radulf de Warenne appears in two charters, one dated between 1027 and 1035, with a second dating from about 1050 and also naming his wife, Beatrice. A Roger son of Radulf de Warenne appears in a charter dated 1040/1053.  In 1059, a Radulf appears with his wife Emma and their sons Radulf and William. These occurrences have historically been interpreted as representing a single Radulf with successive wives, with Beatrice being the mother of William and hence identical to Gunnor's unnamed niece.  However, the 1059 charter explicitly names Emma as William's mother. A reevaluation of the evidence led Katherine Keats-Rohan to suggest that the traditional view has mistakenly compressed two distant men of the same name into a single chimeric individual.  She sees the earliest known family members as Radulf (I) and his wife Beatrice.  Associations with the village of Vascœuil led Keats-Rohan to identify the latter with a 1054/60 widow, Beatrice, daughter of Tesselin, vicomte of Rouen, and since another Rouen vicomte married a niece of Gunnor, this may represent the connection to the ducal family to which Robert de Torigny alluded.  Keats-Rohan sees Radulf (I) and Beatrice as parents of a Radulf (II) and Roger de Mortimer, with Radulf (II) in turn being the 1059 husband of Emma and by her father of Radulf (III), the heir in Normandy, and Earl William.

Earldom
William de Warenne, 1st Earl of Surrey (died 1088), fought for William the Conqueror at the Battle of Hastings in 1066 and after was made the first Earl of Surrey with land in Surrey and twelve other counties. The family was based in Lewes, Sussex and had castles in Yorkshire, Normandy, and Reigate Castle in Surrey.

An account of the life of William de Warenne, 2nd Earl of Surrey (1088-1138) known as the Warenne Chronicle was written shortly after 1157, probably for his granddaughter Isabel de Warenne, Countess of Surrey and her husband William of Blois, Count of Boulogne.  He had a brother Ralph who joined in charters with the 1st and 2nd Earls in the 1130s and 1140s, including a donations to Longueville and Bellencombe Priories, near Rouen, Normandy, and to the family's foundation, Lewes Priory in Sussex, England, the latter being secured with a lock of hair from his own and from Ralph's head cut by Henry of Blois, bishop of Winchester, before the altar of the priory church.

The family held the Earldom of Surrey for three generations, before William de Warenne, 3rd Earl of Surrey, died on crusade in 1148, leaving an only daughter and heiress, who married successively William of Blois, the son of King Stephen, and Hamelin, illegitimate half-brother of king Henry II.  The latter adopted the Warenne surname and give rise to a second line of Surrey Earls that lasted until the death of John de Warenne, 7th Earl of Surrey in 1347, when Surrey passed via his sister to the FitzAlan Earls of Arundel.

Other branches

Esneval
A likely brother of the 1st Earl of Surrey, another Rodulf, held lands that had been held by his father in the Pays de Caux and near Rouen. By 1172, these lands were in possession of Robert d'Esneval as a part of the barony of Esneval, and it is supposed that the family d'Esneval may derive from an heiress of this Rodulf's line.

Whitchurch
Among the holdings of William de Warenne, 1st Earl of Surrey was some land in Whitchurch, Shropshire, and this likely led to his kin becoming its early lords. A William fitz Ranulf is recorded as the lord of Whitchurch, first appearing in 1176, and was ancestor of a family that sometimes were called de Warenne, along with de Whitchurch, de Blancminster, and de Albo Monasterio.  Robert Eyton considered it likely that Ralph de Warenne, son of William de Warenne, 2nd Earl of Surrey, was the father of this William, and that Ralph had likely been lord before William fitz Ranulf. It is known that Ralph de Warenne had a son named William, who confirmed and expanded a donation of Norfolk land that his father had made to made to Lewes Priory, and that the Whitchurch heirs likewise maintained an association with Lewes.   Writing in 1923, William Farrer agreed.  However, in a later publication Charles Travis Clay elaborated on Farrer's original work and drew attention to a Domesday tenant of William de Warenne, 1st Earl of Surrey, named Ranulf nepos (nephew). It does not specify of whom he was nephew, but Clay suggests it was his feudal overlord, Earl William.  This Ranulf nepos held Middleton, Suffolk, which was later owned by William fitz Ranulf, Lord of Whitchurch, leading Clay to speculate that the Warennes of Whitchurch may instead have descended from this Domesday tenant rather than from the son of the 2nd Earl.  William, son of William fitz Ranulf of Whitchurch, left a sole daughter and heiress, from whom the Whitchurch inheritance passed to Robert l'Estrange. Eyton suggested that Griffith de Warenne, the 13th century founder of the Warrens of Ightfield, Shropshire, was son of William fitz Ranulf de Warenne of Whitchurch.

Wormegay
Reginald de Warenne, younger brother of the 3rd Earl, married the heiress of Wormegay, Norfolk.  His son William de Warenne of Wormegay was a royal justice under Richard I and John.  After his death in 1209, Wormegay passed with his daughter to the Bardolf family.

Earls of Surrey 

The Warenne Earls were called Earl de Warenne at least as often as Earl of Surrey; but they received the 'third penny' of Surrey. This means that they were entitled to one third of the county court fines.  The numbering of the earls follows the Oxford Dictionary of National Biography; some sources number Isabel's husbands as the fourth and fifth earls, increasing the numbering of the later earls by one.
 William de Warenne, 1st Earl of Surrey (died 1088)
 William de Warenne, 2nd Earl of Surrey (died 1138), earldom attainted in 1101, restored 1103
 William de Warenne, 3rd Earl of Surrey (1119–1148)
 Isabel de Warenne, Countess of Surrey (died 1203)
 William I, Count of Boulogne, Earl of Surrey (c. 1137–1159), her first husband, younger son of King Stephen of England.
 Hamelin de Warenne, Earl of Surrey (died 1202), her second husband, illegitimate son of Geoffrey of Anjou. He was called Warenne after his marriage. 
 William de Warenne, 5th Earl of Surrey (died 1240)
 John de Warenne, 6th Earl of Surrey (1231–1304) 
 John de Warenne, 7th Earl of Surrey (1286–1347), grandson.

Other members of the de Warenne family 

Ada de Warenne (or Adeline de Varenne) (c. 1120–1178)
Alice de Warenne, Countess of Arundel (15 June 128723 May 1338)
Isabella de Warenne (c. 1253before 1292)
Reginald de Warenne (between 1121 and 11261179)
William de Warenne (1256-1286), only son and heir apparent to John de Warenne, 6th Earl of Surrey
William de Warenne (justice) (died c. 1208), justice of the Curia Regis

Notes

References

Sources

 

Anglo-Norman families